Daniel Jasinski (born 5 August 1989 in Bochum) is a male discus thrower from Germany. He won the Olympic bronze medal in 2016. It was an unexpected first medal in a major championship.

Career
He competed at the 2015 World Championships in Beijing without qualifying for the final. In addition, he finished seventh at the 2014 European Championships in Zürich.

His father and coach Mirosław Jasiński, a former discus thrower himself, comes from Bydgoszcz, Poland. His father had previously coached Michael Möllenbeck and Oliver-Sven Buder to world championship medals.

His personal best in the event is 67.16 metres set in Wiesbaden in 2016.

Competition record

See also
Germany at the 2015 World Championships in Athletics

References

External links
 
 
 

1989 births
Living people
German male discus throwers
Sportspeople from Bochum
World Athletics Championships athletes for Germany
German people of Polish descent
Ruhr University Bochum alumni
Athletes (track and field) at the 2016 Summer Olympics
Olympic athletes of Germany
Olympic bronze medalists for Germany
Medalists at the 2016 Summer Olympics
Olympic bronze medalists in athletics (track and field)
Athletes (track and field) at the 2020 Summer Olympics